The Parson and the Outlaw is a 1957 American Western film directed by Oliver Drake for Charles "Buddy" Rogers Productions and distributed by Columbia Pictures. Written by Drake and John Mantley, the film stars Anthony Dexter as Billy the Kid, along with Charles "Buddy" Rogers, Sonny Tufts, Marie Windsor and Jean Parker. This was the final screen appearance by Rogers before his retirement from films.

Plot
Billy the Kid tries to live in peace under a new name in a frontier town, but he is soon approached by a preacher who asks for his help in freeing the town from the ruthless Colonel Morgan and his gunman Jack Slade.

Cast
 Anthony Dexter as Billy the Kid
 Sonny Tufts as Jack Slade
 Marie Windsor as Tonya 
 Charles "Buddy" Rogers as Reverend Jericho Jones
 Jean Parker as Sarah Jones
 Robert Lowery as Colonel Jefferson Morgan
 Bob Steele as Ace Jardine (erroneously credited as Bob Steel)
 Bob Duncan as Marshall Pat Garrett 
 Joe Sodja as Ben, the Balladeer

Release
The Parson and the Outlaw was commercially released in the United States in September 1957.

References

External links
 
 

1957 films
1957 Western (genre) films
American Western (genre) films
Biographical films about Billy the Kid
Columbia Pictures films
1950s English-language films
Films directed by Oliver Drake
1950s American films